Peter Malick (born November 28, 1951) is an American blues guitarist and record producer.

Music career
In the late 1960s, Malick was a member of the band Listening. Listening was signed by Vanguard Records in New York City when Malick was sixteen.

He played guitar with blues pianist Otis Spann, who invited Malick to live with his family in Chicago. Over the years, Malick backed up and toured with blues greats such as Muddy Waters, Big Mama Thornton, and John Lee Hooker. Later, Malick was a conductor and music director for the national touring company of Hair. Malick next joined the James Montgomery Band, recording First Time Out and High Roller, both for Capricorn Records.

For the next twenty years, he made money at cards. He returned to music in the 1990s, recording Wrong Side of My Life (1998) and Sons of the Jet Age (2000). He won the W.C. Handy Award for historic album of the year in 2001 for the Otis Span album Last Call. The next year he released an album of recordings made with Norah Jones.

Awards
 W. C. Handy Award, Last Call (2001)
 Top Blues Album, Billboard magazine, New York City (2003)

Discography
 Wrong Side of My Life (Mr. Cat, 1998)
 Sons of the Jet Age (Mr. Cat, 2000)
 New York City (eOne/Koch, 2003)
 Chance & Circumstance (eOne/Koch, 2003)
 New York City: The Remix Album (eOne/Koch, 2004) 
 The Chill Album (eOne/Koch, 2005)

with James Cotton Blues Band 
 Cut You Loose  (Vanguard, 1967)

with Listening
 Listening (Vanguard, 1968)

with James Montgomery Band
 First Time Out (Capricorn/Warner Bros., 1973)
 High Roller (Capricorn/Warner Bros. 1974)

with Butch Norton
 Duets from the Spin Dry Cycle  (Luxury Wafers, 2010)

with Jung Yong-hwa
 27 Years (FNC, 2015)

As producer
 Otis Spann's Last Call: Live at Boston Tea Party (Conqueroot 2001)
 Nada Bhava (Anusara, 2007)
 Starting Ground, Josh Blackburn (Mr. Cat 2007)
 Whiskey with Free Dominguez (2006)
 Transcendence, Tony Khalife
 Miles, JOHNA (2013)
 Grow, Spencer Livivngston (2013)
 Axels and Sockets, The Jeffrey Lee Pierce Sessions Project (2014)
All The Things That Fall, Courtney Jones (LuxuryWafers 2013)

Movies and television
 Runaway Jury (2003)
 Third Watch
 Lullaby (2004)
 Broke Sky (2007)
 Twisted (2013)

References

External links
 Official site
 George Graham Review of The Peter Malick Group: Chance & Circumstance
 Rambles Magazine Review
 Boston Sound Review - Neat old images
 NPR:Otis Spann's Last Recording

1951 births
Living people
American blues guitarists
American male guitarists
Record producers from Massachusetts
American blues singer-songwriters
People from Brookline, Massachusetts
20th-century American guitarists
20th-century American male musicians
American male singer-songwriters
Singer-songwriters from Massachusetts